Pablo Ramón Parra (born 30 June 2001) is a Spanish footballer who plays for Real Madrid Castilla. Mainly a centre-back, he can also play as a right-back.

Club career
Born in Calvià, Majorca, Balearic Islands, Ramón represented RCD Mallorca as a youth. On 9 September 2018, aged 17, he made his senior debut with the reserves by starting in a 7–0 away routing of CD Murense.

Ramón made his first-team debut on 31 October 2018, starting in a 1–2 home loss against Real Valladolid, for the season's Copa del Rey; by doing so, he became the first player of the 21st century to appear for the club. The following 31 January, he agreed to a contract with Real Madrid, effective as of 1 July.

Career statistics

Club
.

Honours
Real Madrid Juvenil A
UEFA Youth League: 2019–20

References

External links
Real Madrid profile

2001 births
Living people
Footballers from Mallorca
Spanish footballers
Association football defenders
Tercera División players
RCD Mallorca B players
RCD Mallorca players
Spain youth international footballers
Real Madrid Castilla footballers
Primera Federación players
Segunda División B players